Lachnomyrmex fernandezi is a species of ant in the subfamily Myrmicinae.

References

External links

Myrmicinae
Hymenoptera of South America
Insects described in 2008